Catoptria mytilella is a species of moth in the family Crambidae described by Jacob Hübner in 1805. It is found in large parts of Europe (except Ireland, Great Britain, the Netherlands, Fennoscandia, Denmark, the Baltic region, Ukraine and Portugal), Asia Minor and the northern Caucasus.

The wingspan is 17–25 mm. Adults are on wing from mid-June to late July in one generation per year.

The larvae possibly feed on mosses.

Subspecies
Catoptria mytilella mytilella
Catoptria mytilella vilarrubiae (Agenjo, 1954) (Spain)

References

Crambini
Moths of Europe
Moths of Asia
Moths described in 1805